"" is the 19th single by Japanese singer and voice actress Nana Mizuki, which was released on January 21, 2009, by King Records bearing the catalog number KICM-1270. composed, arranged, and produced by members of Elements Garden, Miki Watabe, Yōhei Sugita, Hibiki, Sayuri, and Nishi-ken. The single reached number 2 in Japan's Oricon weekly singles charts for the week of February 1, 2009.

Track listing 
 
Lyrics: Nana Mizuki
Composition: Noriyasu Agematsu (Elements Garden)
Arrangement: Hitoshi Fujima (Elements Garden)
Opening theme for anime television series White Album
 "Pride of Glory"
Lyrics: Hibiki
Composition, arrangement: Miki Watabe
Ending theme in January for radio show Radio De Culture.
 
Lyrics: Sayuri
Composition: Yōhei Sugita
Arrangement: Nishi-ken
Ending theme for radio show

Charts

Total Sales: 62,869

References

2009 singles
Nana Mizuki songs
Songs written by Nana Mizuki
2009 songs
King Records (Japan) singles